Church of St. Anthony of Padua (Samogitian: Šv. Ontana Padovėitė bažninčė) is a Roman Catholic church in Ukrinai, Lithuania.

History
The first church in Ukrinai was consecrated in 1784. Its construction was probably funded by a nobleman Laurynas Pilsudskis. The nobility of Ukrinai and Bukončiai built a new church in 1803, however it burnt down after around half a century.

Current wooden church was built in 1857 and in 1913 it was enlarged.

Since 1853 Ukrinai has been a filial of Židikai parish.

Architecture
The church is rectangle, with two small towers. There are four altars. It reflects the characteristics of Lithuanian vernacular architecture.

The main altar is a vernacular interpretation of Baroque

External links

mke.lt
Info at the webpage of the Diocese of Telšiai

References

Roman Catholic churches in Telšiai County
Buildings and structures in Telšiai County
Roman Catholic churches completed in 1857
Tourist attractions in Telšiai County
19th-century Roman Catholic church buildings in Lithuania